Ministry of Works and Human Settlement (Bhutan) is ministry of Bhutan responsible for enabling provision of physical infrastructure, and embodying the Bhutanese cultural and traditional values to foster socio-economic development.

Departments 
The Ministry of Works and Human Settlement (MoWHS) has three departments:

Department of Roads
Department of Engineering Services
Department of Human Settlement

These departments are supported by the Directorate Services, comprising the Human Resource and Finance Divisions, and the Procurement, Administration and ICT Sections.

Three other agencies namely, the Bhutan Standards Bureau (erstwhile Standards and Quality Control Authority), National Housing Development Corporation and the Construction Development Board of Bhutan, which were previously part of the ministry, are now autonomous agencies.

Minister 
 Lyonpo Ugyen Tshering
 Kinzang Dorji (2003 - 2007)
 Yeshey Zimba (11 April 2008 - ...)
 Dorji Choden (2013 - ...)
 Dorji Tshering (7 November 2018 - ...)

References

Government ministries of Bhutan
Infrastructure in Bhutan
Transport in Bhutan
Buildings and structures in Bhutan